Katyar Kaljat Ghusali is a 2015 Indian Marathi-language epic musical drama film based on a play by the same name. Directed by Subodh Bhave, the film stars Sachin Pilgaonkar, Shankar Mahadevan, and Subodh Bhave in lead roles. The film marks the directorial debut for Bhave, and the theatrical acting debut for Shankar Mahadevan. The original play, written by Purushottam Darvhekar, premiered in 1967 in Mumbai, where Hindustani classical vocalist Vasantrao Deshpande played one of the protagonists. In 2010, the play was relaunched with protagonists essayed by Rahul Deshpande, grandson of Vasantrao Deshpande and singer Mahesh Kale. The film's music is composed by Shankar–Ehsaan–Loy, and retained some of the songs from the original play composed by Jitendra Abhisheki.

The film is selected as one of the 26 films to be screened in Goa at 46th International Film Festival of India. The movie was also considered for the United Nations Educational, Scientific and Cultural Organisation's (UNESCO) Fellini medal.

Plot 

Set during the British Raj era, Pandit Bhanu Shankar Shastri (Shankar Mahadevan) is an Indian classical singer living in the princely state of Vishrampur with his daughter Uma Shastri (Mrunmayee Deshpande). During one of his shows at Miraj, Shastri meets another classical singer Khansaheb Aftab Hussain Bareliwale (Sachin Pilgaonkar) and requests him to visit Vishrampur. On Dasara festival, the Maharaja of the state arranges an annual singing competition with the winner to be given the status of royal singer, Haveli (Mansion), and a "Katyar" (dagger). The Maharaja proclaims that the state would pardon one murder if committed by the royal singer with this dagger in self-defense. Shastri is challenged by Khansaheb but wins the competition.

Unable to defeat Shastri for fourteen consecutive years, Khansaheb is often humiliated by his wife Nabila (Sakshi Tanwar) and villagers. He survives a suicide attempt but confronts his hatred towards Bhanu Shankar Shastri. Then Nabila (Sakshi Tanwar) gives poison to Shastri which makes him unable to sing, but he can talk. In the following annual competition, Shastri leaves the stage without singing thus making Khansaheb the winner and the royal singer. Khansaheb moves to the haveli with his daughter Zareena (Amruta Khanvilkar) and Shastri leaves the village without informing anyone.

One of Shastri's pupils, Sadashiv (Subodh Bhave), arrives at the haveli to learn music but is disappointed with Shastri's disappearance. Sadashiv meets Khansaheb who, on listening Sadashiv's Shastri-like singing, throws him out of the haveli. Sadashiv, with the help of Zareena, locates Uma and learns the truth about Shastri's renunciation of music and Nabila's attempt to poison Shastri to enable Khansaheb win the competition. Sadashiv attempts to murder Khansaheb but Zarena dissuades him and requests him to challenge Khansaheb in the annual competition. Sadashiv then starts learning music from Uma through Shastri's book and Gramophone records. Later, Sadashiv and Uma locate Shastri in another village and bring him home. Shastri asks Sadashiv to learn from Khansaheb, but knowing Sadashiv's Shastri-like singing style, Khansaheb rejects him as a pupil. Sadashiv then starts learning from Khansaheb in disguise, but gets caught. Sadashiv, when challenged by Khansaheb to out-do him, loses and becomes Khansaheb's slave. As Khansaheb's slave, he cannot sing without Khansaheb's permission. Zareena sees the unfairness in this arrangement and blackmails Khansaab into returning Sadashiv's voice by threatening to expose him in the court. Khansaheb thus releases Sadashiv from his services.

In the following annual competition, Sadashiv challenges Khansaheb. In Jugalbandi (duet), Khansaheb notices that Sadashiv has learnt his singing style, he accuses Sadashiv of stealing his music. He also requests the Maharaja to let him use the dagger in self-defense as he thinks Sadashiv is a threat to his music. The Maharaja agrees but Sadashiv asks for a final performance. He also requests Khansaheb to accept him as a pupil if Khansaheb likes his singing. Sadashiv performs with Shastri's and Khansaheb's singing style. Khansaheb forgives Sadashiv but declines to accept him as a pupil as he thinks he has put himself down with all his earlier deeds with Sadashiv.

Cast 
 Sachin Pilgaonkar as Khansaheb Aftab Hussain Bareliwale
 Shankar Mahadevan as Pandit Bhanu Shankar Shastri
 Subodh Bhave as Sadashiv Gurav, Panditji's student
 Swapnil Rajshekhar as Maharaja of Vishrampur, King Vishnuraj
 Asmita Chinchalkar as Queen of Vishrampur
 Amruta Khanvilkar as Zareena, Khansaheb's daughter
 Mrunmayee Deshpande as Uma, Panditji's daughter
 Pushkar Shrotri as Banke Bihari, the royal poet
 Sakshi Tanwar as Nabila, Khansaheb's wife
 Sahil Koparde as Diwanji, secretary of Vishrampur
 Reema Lagoo as voice of the Katyar

Production 

The film is based on a play by the same name, released in 1967. The original play had Hindustani classical singer Vasantrao Deshpande playing the role of Khansaheb. The play was revived in 2010 and the protagonists were played by Mahesh Kale as Sadashiv and Rahul Deshpande as Khansaheb. The classical singer Rahul Deshpande is a grandson of Vasantrao Deshpande. The actor Subodh Bhave was associated with the revived play and decided to make the film representation. Pushkar Shrotri also played the small role of Banke Bihari, the royal poet in the play.

Bhave approached trio Shankar–Ehsaan–Loy to compose the music for the film. He also requested Shankar Mahadevan to play the role of Pandit Bhanu Shankar Shastri, to which singer–composer agreed. Mahadevan acted, sung, and composed for the film. The film marks acting debut for Mahadevan and directorial debut for Bhave. The film has retained some of the songs from the play, composed by Jitendra Abhisheki. Sachin Pilgaonkar was approached to play the role of Khansaheb. Despite being a Marathi language film, all of Pilgaonkar's dialogue are in Urdu. Other actors include Amruta Khanvilkar as Zarina, Mrunmayee Deshpande as Uma, Swapnil Rajshekhar as Maharaja of Vishrampur, King Vishnuraj and Sakshi Tanwar as Nabila (Khansaheb's wife). Vikram Gaikwad has worked as a make-up artist for the film. Prakash Kapadia who had written the screenplay for Bollywood films like Devdas (2002), Black (2005), and Saawariya (2007) has written the screenplay for the film and this is his first association with Marathi cinema.

Soundtrack 
The film uses various songs from the original play, where the music has been recreated by the musician trio Shankar-Ehsaan-Loy. Some new songs have also been created to feature in the film. The song "Dil Ki Tapish" is based on the Keeravani raga.

 – Music recreated by Shankar–Ehsaan–Loy

Release and reception 
The film was released in the Indian states of Maharashtra, Karnataka, Telangana, Goa, Gujarat, and Madhya Pradesh, and internationally in cities including San Francisco, Dallas, and New Jersey, on 12 November, as well as Orlando on 13 December. The film had English subtitles, and was shown on 220 screens showing 3,500 shows. After continued positive responses in the 2nd week, the number of screenings was increased to 300, showing 3,900 shows across India. The film is distributed by Essel Vision. The film was released in Dubai as a special screening on 18 December 2015 and received tremendous response from UAE public. It also became the first ever Marathi movie to release in Bahrain, Australia and Japan as a special screening on 8 January 2016, 31 January 2016 and 5 March 2016, and received very good response from the viewers. The film was screened in Australia in all the major cities including Melbourne, Brisbane, Adelaide, Perth and Canberra. It was screened in Japan at Aeon Cinema in the Tokyo suburb of Myoden. The film was a major success in the United States and was screened in over 50 cities through San Francisco Bay Area-based non-profit Indian Classical Music and Arts (ICMA) Foundation.

ABP Majha gave 4 out of 5 stars and declared the film "a rich masterpiece". Pune Mirror gave 4 out of 5 stars and calling it "a well-packaged and culturally significant entertainment for the new generation". The Maharashtra Times rated it 4 out of 5. The Times of India gave 4 out of 5 stars.

Box office

Accolades

See also
 Highest grossing Marathi films

References

External links 
 

2015 films
Indian musical films
Indian films based on plays
Shankar–Ehsaan–Loy
2010s Marathi-language films
2015 directorial debut films
2010s musical films